Yato Dharmastato Jayah is a Sanskrit shloka, which occurs a total of eleven times in the Hindu epic, the Mahabharata, and means "Where there is Dharma, there will be Victory".

Meaning 

He says that "victory is ensured for the side standing with Dharma, where Krishna is, there is victory". It occurs again when Gandhari, the mother of Kauravas, having lost all her sons in the war, utters it with the intent: "Where there is Lord Krishna there is Dharma, and where there is Dharma there is Victory".

Reference in Hindu scriptures 
The phrase is often complemented with another shloka in the Mahabharata which conveys, "Where there is Dharma, there is Krishna". Dhritarashtra is warned using this phrase by Vyasa to discourage the unrighteous ways of his sons. It again occurs in the Stri Parva of Hindu Itihasa Mahabharata. It is also told by Bhisma to Duryodhana in Bhagavad Gita Parva. Yato Dharmastato Jayah occurs a total of eleven times in the Mahabharata.

In Vidura Niti, when Dhritarashtra is interacting with Vidura, he uses this phrase. He says, "though I know that victory lies on the path of Dharma, even then I cannot forsake my son Duryodhana".

Dharma Viveka, a Sanskrit poem composed by Halayudhvi, ends with this phrase.

In studies 

In Bala Vihar, an educational activity for children, Chinmaya Mission uses this message to supplement the concept of Karma. Scholar Alf Hiltebeitel takes this up in detail in his study of Dharma and Bhagwat Gita. Before Alf, the scholar Sylvain Lévi is known to have studied this phrase in detail with varying interpretations. In an article of the Indian Defence Review journal, it is characterized as "best sums up the Indian thought", here meaning, "If we are righteous, then victory will be ours [India's]". In the study of ethics, it is taken to convey that "ultimate victory is that of righteousness".

As Motto in Jaipur State Coat of Arms 
This phrase was written as the Motto in the Coat of Arms of former Jaipur State under Rajputana Agency. Also this motto was used by several other small estates related with former Jaipur State.

See also
 Dharma
 Karma

References 

Mahabharata
Words and phrases with no direct English translation
Hindu philosophical concepts
Sanskrit mottos